Beldina Odenyo Onassis (30 August 1990 – 5 November 2021), also known as Heir of the Cursed, was a Kenyan-born Scottish musician, singer, poet and writer.

Onassis was born in Kenya on 30 August 1990, before moving with her family to Lockerbie in Scotland when she was a child. Her obituary in the British newspaper The Times describes her as 'Kenyan-Scottish'.  

Onassis previously performed under the name Genesee.  She worked mostly in Glasgow and was named one of Scotland’s 30 most inspiring women under 30.

She worked with the National Theatre of Scotland on Lament for Sheku Bayoh and with the all-female songwriting collective Hen Hoose. 

A regular performer at Celtic Connections Festival, she won the Danny Kyle award.

Onassis died on 5 November 2021, at the age of 31.

References 

1990 births
2021 deaths
21st-century Scottish women musicians
Kenyan emigrants to the United Kingdom
Scottish people of Kenyan descent
Scottish theatre people